Niclas Leif Rasck (born 10 March 1969) is a Swedish former footballer who played as a defender and spent most of his career with Djurgårdens IF. He made 152 appearances for Djurgården.

Prior to joining the Stockholm club, he played for Örebro SK and Ludvika FK, where his career began. He declared his retirement from professional football at the end of the 2006 season.

Honours 
Djurgårdens IF
 Allsvenskan: 2002, 2003, 2005
 Superettan: 2000
 Svenska Cupen: 2002, 2004, 2005

References

1969 births
Living people
Association football defenders
Swedish footballers
Allsvenskan players
Superettan players
Djurgårdens IF Fotboll players
Örebro SK players